Collinwood High School is a public high school located in the Collinwood neighborhood on the east side of Cleveland, Ohio, United States. It is part of the Cleveland Metropolitan School District. The school is divided into three academies: Advanced Placement Academy, STEM Teaching Professions Academy, and Academy of Interior and Fashion Design.

State championships

 Boys track and field – 1962
 Girls track and field – 1997, 1998, 1999, 2000, 2001, 2004, 2005, 2006, 2010

Notable alumni
Tony Adamle (1924–2000) professional football player with the Cleveland Browns in the All-America Football Conference and the National Football League (NFL)
Eppie Barney (1944–2004) NFL player (Cleveland Browns)
James Cotton (1976–), professional football player
Jerry Dybzinski (1955–present), former professional baseball player in Major League Baseball 
George Fett (1920–1989), cartoonist
Danny Greene (1933–1977), Irish American mobster
John Claude Gummoe (1938–) singer-songwriter, lead singer of The Cascades, wrote and recorded "Rhythm of the Rain"
Jeff Johnson, (1958–) Cleveland City Council member and former Ohio state senator
Omari Jordan (1978–) professional football player with the Carolina Panthers in the National Football League (NFL)
Richard Nardi (1915–1965), professional football player in the NFL
Andre Norton (1912–2005), author
Sam Palumbo (1932–) professional football player in the American Football League (AFL) and NFL
Michael D. Polensek (1949–present), Cleveland City Council member
Cecil Shorts III (1987–), professional football player in the NFL
George Voinovich (1936–2016), former Mayor of Cleveland, two-term Ohio Governor, and two-term U.S. Senator.
Stephanie Tubbs Jones, (1949–2008), U. S. Congresswoman (1999-2008)
Ray Zeh, (1914–2003), college football scoring leader in 1935

See also
Collinwood school fire

References

External links
 District website
 Collinwood High School yearbooks and student newspapers available on Cleveland Public Library Digital Gallery, various years 1920s through 1952.

Collinwood
High schools in Cuyahoga County, Ohio
Education in Cleveland
Public high schools in Ohio
Cleveland Metropolitan School District
1924 establishments in Ohio
Educational institutions established in 1924